Nesamblyops is a genus of beetles in the family Carabidae, containing the following species:

 Nesamblyops oreobius (Broun, 1893)
 Nesamblyops subcaecus (Sharp, 1886)

References

Trechinae